"One, Two, Three, Four, Five" (also known as "1, 2, 3, 4, 5" or "1, 2, 3, 4, 5, Once I Caught a Fish Alive" in other versions) is a popular English-language nursery rhyme and counting-out rhyme. It has a Roud Folk Song Index number of 13530.

Text and melody
A common modern version is:

One, two, three, four, five,
Once I caught a fish alive.
Six, seven, eight, nine, ten,
Then I let it go again.

Why did you let it go?
Because he bit my finger so.
Which finger did it bite?
This little finger on my right.

Origins and meaning

The rhyme is one of many counting-out rhymes. It was first recorded in Mother Goose's Melody around 1765. Like most versions until the late nineteenth century, it had only the first stanza, and dealt with a hare not a fish, with the words:

One, two, three, four and five,
I caught a hare alive;
Six, seven, eight, nine and ten,
I let him go again.

The modern version is derived from three variations collected by Henry Bolton in the 1880s from America.

See also

List of nursery rhymes

Notes

Counting-out rhymes
English nursery rhymes
English folk songs
Songs about fish
Songs about fishers